Presto! Recording Studios is located in Lincoln, Nebraska, and run by brothers Mike Mogis and A.J. Mogis. The studio began in the brothers' North Platte, Nebraska basement and around 1995 moved to the basement of a Lincoln home. First known as Whoopass Recording Studio, the name was later changed to Dead Space Recording. When the brothers moved the studio to its current downtown Lincoln location, they found a vintage Presto brand vinyl recorder left behind by the studio's former occupant, from which the current name was taken.

Because of Lincoln's plan to dismantle most of the streets around the facility in the distant future, Mike Mogis is planning to relocate Presto! Studios to a  indoor basketball court in Omaha, Nebraska. The new studio will be co-owned by Mike Mogis and Conor Oberst. A.J. Mogis has not yet decided if he will be involved.

Artists who have recorded at Presto!

Record labels that have worked with Presto!

Notes

External links
Presto! Recording Studios (dead as of May 24, 2007; Internet Archive version)

Recording studios in the United States
Companies based in Lincoln, Nebraska